Teluk Ramunia is a town in Kota Tinggi District, Johor, Malaysia. It is a well-known bauxite mining town in the early days of Malaysia. It is a sight seeing place, good for a family picnic spot. Now it is known for Oil and Gas Fabrication industries.

References

External links
Towns and Cities in Malaysia

Kota Tinggi District
Towns in Johor